On the Loose is a 1951 American drama film directed by Charles Lederer and written by Dale Eunson and Katherine Albert. The film stars Joan Evans, Melvyn Douglas, Lynn Bari, Robert Arthur and Hugh O'Brian. The film was released on September 28, 1951 by RKO Pictures.

Plot
Just a teenager, Jill Bradley has become suicidal over recent events. Almost everything in her life has gone wrong since her birthday, which her parents all but ignored, going out for the evening and leaving her by herself with a cake.

Alice and Frank Bradley continue to neglect their daughter. Alice scolds her for buying a new dress. Frank says she can keep it if she does household chores, then becomes furious after Jill sneaks out to see boyfriend Larry Lindsay and coming home late, smelling of liquor.

Unjust rumors are spread about Jill's reputation and teachers treat her unfairly as well. Classmates refuse to come to her home when invited and one provokes a fight. Frank, called to the school, slaps Jill rather than trust her. Larry's influence is a factor in her life. After ordering them champagne in a restaurant by pretending it's for their parents, he gets her into more trouble, then breaks up with her.

Frank tries to make amends to his daughter by taking her to a roadhouse and dancing together. Larry enters and wrongly assumes Frank is a date, insulting Jill as a girl of low morals. Frank strikes the boy and ends up under arrest for assault.

In court, although her father has advised her to keep silent, Jill testifies as to why Frank did what he did. The court lets him go, he and Alice vow to become better parents, and when they throw Jill a party, all her old school friends are there.

Cast 
Joan Evans as Jill Bradley
Melvyn Douglas as Frank Bradley
Lynn Bari as Alice Bradley
Robert Arthur as Larry Lindsay
Hugh O'Brian as Dr. Phillips
Constance Hilton as Susan Tanner
Mickey Kuhn as Bob Vance 
Susan Morrow as Catherine 
Lillian Hamilton as Miss Druten

References

External links 
 

1951 films
American black-and-white films
RKO Pictures films
1951 drama films
American drama films
Films directed by Charles Lederer
Films scored by Leigh Harline
1950s English-language films
1950s American films